"Sugah Wooga" was a chart hit for R&B female trio the Three Playmates in 1958. It was their only hit.

Background
The female trio was from Newark, New Jersey, and consisted of the Beatty sisters, Lucille and Alma and Gwen Brooks. The song they recorded was a dance song.

The single, backed with "Lovey Dovey Pair", was recorded with backup from musicians that included Buddy Lucas on tenor sax, Bobby Banks on organ, and Leonard Gaskin on bass. It was written by Brooks and Ozzie Cadena. It was released on Savoy 1528.

Reception 
The review of their single in Billboard December 16, 1957 issue was positive, referring to the songs as powerful entries and noting the clever use of voices on the A side. The B side was a "tender" ballad about adolescent love.

Chart performance
The single did very well in some cities, hitting the number-one spot. By December 30, it was noted as a hit and selling fast,  with momentum continuing in February 1958. The single peaked nationally at #89 on March 10, 1958.

References

External links
 Youtube: Three Playmates - Sugah Wooga - Late 50's Doo Wop Rocker

1957 singles
1957 songs
Songs written by Dianne Brooks
Savoy Records singles